Dovev Gabay is an Israeli football forward who currently plays for Maccabi Kabilio Jaffa.

References

External links
 

1987 births
Living people
Israeli footballers
Association football forwards
Maccabi Petah Tikva F.C. players
Maccabi Herzliya F.C. players
Hapoel Be'er Sheva F.C. players
Beitar Jerusalem F.C. players
Bnei Yehuda Tel Aviv F.C. players
Hapoel Ashkelon F.C. players
Hapoel Hadera F.C. players
Hapoel Umm al-Fahm F.C. players
Maccabi Ahi Nazareth F.C. players
Maccabi Jaffa F.C. players
Israeli Premier League players
Liga Leumit players
Israeli people of Moroccan-Jewish descent
Footballers from Hadera